This is a list of Lockheed F-104 Starfighter variants.

XF-104

Two prototype aircraft equipped with Wright J65 engines (the J79 was not yet ready); one aircraft equipped with the M61 cannon as an armament test bed. Both aircraft were destroyed in crashes.

YF-104A

17 pre-production aircraft used for engine, equipment, and flight testing. Most were later converted to F-104A standard.

F-104A
A total of 153 initial production versions were built. The F-104A was in USAF service from 1958 through 1960, then transferred to ANG until 1963 when they were recalled by the USAF Air Defense Command for the 319th and 331st Fighter Interceptor Squadrons. Some were released for export to Jordan, Pakistan, and Taiwan, each of whom used it in combat. In 1967 the 319th F-104As and Bs were re-engined with the J79-GE-19 engines with 17,900 lbf (79.6 kN) of thrust in afterburner; service ceiling with this engine was in excess of 73,000 ft (22,250 m). In 1969, all the F-104A/Bs in ADC service were retired. On 18 May 1958, an F-104A set a world speed record of 1,404.19 mph (2,259.82 km/h).

NF-104A

Three demilitarized F-104A airframes with an additional 6,000 lbf (27 kN) Rocketdyne LR121/AR-2-NA-1 rocket engine and modified systems, used for astronaut training at altitudes up to 120,800 ft (36,820 m).

QF-104A
A total of 22 F-104As converted into radio-controlled drones and test aircraft.

F-104B
Tandem two-seat, dual-control trainer version of F-104A, 26-built. Enlarged rudder and ventral fin, no cannon and reduced internal fuel, but otherwise combat-capable. A few were supplied to Jordan, Pakistan and Taiwan.

F-104C

Fighter-bomber version for USAF Tactical Air Command, with improved fire-control radar (AN/ASG-14T-2), centerline and two wing pylons (for a total of five), and ability to carry one Mk 28 or Mk 43 nuclear weapon on the centerline pylon. The F-104C also had in-flight refuelling capability. On 14 December 1959, an F-104C set a world altitude record of 103,395 ft (31,515 m), 77 built.

F-104D
Dual-control trainer versions of F-104C, 21 built.

F-104DJ
Dual-control trainer version of F-104J for Japanese Air Self-Defense Force, 20 built by Lockheed and assembled by Mitsubishi.

F-104F
Dual-control trainers based on F-104D, but using the upgraded engine of the F-104G. No radar, and not combat-capable. Produced as interim trainers for the Luftwaffe. All F-104F aircraft were retired by 1971; 30 built.

F-104G

1,122 aircraft of the main version produced as multi-role fighter-bombers. Manufactured by Lockheed, and under license by Canadair and a consortium of European companies which included Messerschmitt/MBB, Dornier, Fiat, Fokker and SABCA. The type featured strengthened fuselage and wing structure, increased internal fuel capacity, an enlarged vertical fin, strengthened landing gear with larger tires and revised flaps for improved combat maneuvering. Upgraded avionics included a new Autonetics NASARR F15A-41B radar with air-to-air and ground mapping modes, the Litton LN-3 Inertial Navigation System (the first on a production fighter) and an infrared sight.

RF-104G
189 tactical reconnaissance models based on F-104G, usually with three KS-67A cameras mounted in the forward fuselage in place of cannon.

TF-104G
220 combat-capable trainer version of F-104G; no cannon or centerline pylon, reduced internal fuel. One aircraft used by Lockheed as a demonstrator with the civil registration number L104L, was flown by Jackie Cochran to set three women's world speed records in 1964. This aircraft later served in the Netherlands. A pair of two-seat TF-104Gs and a single-seat F-104G joined the Dryden inventory in June 1975.

F-104H
Projected export version based on a F-104G with simplified equipment and optical gunsight. Not built.

F-104J
Specialized interceptor version of the F-104G for the Japanese ASDF, built under license by Mitsubishi for the air-superiority fighter role, armed with cannon and four Sidewinders; no strike capability. Some were converted to UF-104J radio-controlled target drones and destroyed. Total of 210 built, three built by Lockheed, 29 built by Mitsubushi from Lockheed built components and 178 built by Mitsubishi.

F-104N
Three F-104Gs were delivered to NASA in 1963 for use as high-speed chase aircraft. One, piloted by Joe Walker, collided with an XB-70 on 8 June 1966.

F-104S (Lockheed Model CL-901)

Produced mainly by Fiat and Aeritalia (one aircraft was lost before delivery), upgraded for the interception role having NASARR R-21G/H radar with moving target indicator and continuous wave illuminator for SARH missiles (initially AIM-7 Sparrow), two additional wing and two underbelly hardpoints (to give a total of nine), uprated J79-GE-19 engine with 52.8 kN (11,870 lbf) thrust (79.6 kN/17,900 lbf with afterburner), and two additional ventral fins for increased stability at high Mach numbers. Up to two Sparrow; and two, theoretically four or six, Sidewinder missiles were carried on all the hardpoints except the central (underbelly), or seven 340 kg (750 lb) bombs (normally, two-four 227–340 kg/500-750 lb). Range was up to 1,250 km (777 mi) with four tanks, ferry range 2,940 km (1,827 mi). Aircraft allocated to air defence missions had their 20 mm (.79 in) M-61 Vulcan cannon removed. The F-104S was cleared for a higher maximum takeoff weight, allowing it to carry up to 7,500 lb (3,400 kg) of stores; other Starfighters had a maximum external load of 4,000 lb (1,814 kg). With four under wing drop tanks range was up to 780 mi (1,250 km). Production of the F-104S totalled 286, with the Italian Air Force taking delivery of 246 and the Turkish Air Force receiving 40 aircraft.

F-104S-ASA
(Aggiornamento Sistemi d'Arma – "Weapon Systems Update") – An upgraded F-104S, 147 were modified from existing airframes, with Fiat R21G/M1 radar with frequency hopping, look-down/shoot-down capability, new IFF and weapons delivery computer, and provision for AIM-9L all-aspect Sidewinder and Selenia Aspide missiles. Due to the delays of Aspide integration, the initial version, with Raytheon AIM-7 Sparrows was designated ASA-1. When the Aspide became available, all F-104Ss were upgraded to ASA-2 standard. First flown in 1985 the F-104S-ASA was principally an air-defence aircraft without enhancements to ground attack capabilities and were later modified to interceptor standards (CI) with removal of the 20 mm (.79 in) M-61 Vulcan cannon.

F-104S-ASA/M
(Aggiornamento Sistemi d'Arma/Modificato – "Weapon Systems Update/Modified") – 49 F-104S-ASA and 15 two-seat TF-104G aircraft upgraded from 1998 to ASA/M standard with GPS, new TACAN and Litton LN-30A2 INS, refurbished airframe, and improved cockpit displays. All strike-related equipment was removed, including the IRST (the small unit known as 'IR-Sight', forward the windshield). The last Starfighters in combat service, the F-104S-ASA/M was withdrawn in October 2004 (the last unit being 10° Gruppo/9° Stormo, Grazzanise), and temporarily replaced by F-16 Fighting Falcons, whilst awaiting delivery of Eurofighter Typhoons.

CF-104

200 Canadian-built versions, built under license by Canadair and optimized for both nuclear strike and 2-stage-to-orbit payload delivery, having NASARR R-24A radar with air-to-air modes, cannon deleted (restored after 1972), additional internal fuel cell, and Canadian J79-OEL-7 engines with 10,000 lbf (44 kN)/15,800 lbf (70 kN) thrust.

CF-104D
38 dual-control trainer versions of CF-104, built by Lockheed, but with Canadian J79-OEL-7 engines. Some later transferred to Denmark, Norway and Turkey.

See also

References
Notes

Bibliography

 Bashow, David L. Starfighter: A Loving Retrospective of the CF-104 Era in Canadian Fighter Aviation, 1961–1986. Stoney Creek, Ontario: Fortress Publications Inc., 1990. .
 Bashow, David L. "Starwarrior: A First Hand Look at Lockheed's F-104, One of the Most Ambitious Fighters ever Designed!" Wings, Vol. 16, no. 3, June 1986.
 Bowman, Martin W. Lockheed F-104 Starfighter. Ramsbury, Marlborough, Wiltshire, UK: Crowood Press Ltd., 2000. .
 Donald, David, ed. Century Jets. Norwalk, Connecticut: AIRtime Publishing, 2003. .
 Drendel, Lou. F-104 Starfighter in action, Aircraft No. 27. Carrollton, Texas: Squadron/Signal Publications, 1976. .
 Fricker, John and Paul Jackson. "Lockheed F-104 Starfighter". Wings of Fame, Volume 2, 1996, pp. 38–99. London: Aerospace Publishing. .
 Green, William and Gordon Swanborough. The Great Book of Fighters. St. Paul, Minnesota: MBI Publishing, 2001. .
 Higham, Robin and Carol Williams. Flying Combat Aircraft of USAAF-USAF (Vol.2). Manhattan, Kansas: Sunflower University Press, 1978. .
 Hobson, Chris. Vietnam Air Losses, USAF, USN, USMC, Fixed-Wing Aircraft Losses in Southeast Asia 1961–1973. North Branch, Minnesota: Specialty Press, 2001. .
 Jackson, Paul A. German Military Aviation 1956–1976. Hinckley, Leicestershire, UK: Midland Counties Publications, 1976. .
 Jagan, Mohan P.V.S. and Samir Chopra. The India-Pakistan Air War of 1965. New Delhi: Manohar, 2006. .
 Jenkins, Dennis R. "Hun Heaven, The Super Sabre Dance." Wings Magazine, Vol. 35, No. 12, December 2005.
 Jenkins, Dennis R. and Tony R. Landis. Experimental & Prototype U.S. Air Force Jet Fighters. North Branch, Minnesota: Specialty Press, 2008. .
 Käsmann, Ferdinand C.W. Die schnellsten Jets der Welt (German language) Planegg, Germany: Aviatic-Verl., 1994. .
 Kinzey, Bert. F-104 Starfighter in Detail & Scale. Blue Ridge Summit, Pennsylvania: TAB books, 1991. .
 Knaack, Marcelle Size. Encyclopedia of USAF Aircraft and Missile Systems: Vol. 1, Post-WW II Fighters 1945–1973. Washington, DC: Office of Air Force History, 1978. 
 Kropf, Klaus. German Starfighters. Hinckley, Leicestershire, UK: Midland Counties Publications, 2002. .
 Matricardi, Paolo. Aerei militari: Caccia e ricognitori Volume 1. Milano, Mondadori Electa, 2006. No ISBN.
 Nicolli, Ricardo. "Starfighters in the AMI". Air International, Volume 31, No. 6, December 1986, pp. 306–313, 321–322.
 Pace, Steve. Lockheed F-104 Starfighter. St. Paul, Minnesota: Motorbooks International, 1992. .
 Pace, Steve. X-Fighters: USAF Experimental and Prototype Fighters, XP-59 to YF-23. St. Paul, Minnesota: Motorbooks International, 1991. .
 Reed, Arthur. F-104 Starfighter – Modern Combat Aircraft 9. London: Ian Allan Ltd., 1981. .
 Sgarlato, Nico. "F-104 Starfighter" (in Italian). Delta editions, Great Planes Monograph series, February 2004.
 Smith, Philip E. and Peggy Herz. Journey into Darkness: the Gripping Story of an American Pow's Seven Years Trapped Inside Red China During the Vietnam War. New York: Pocket Books, 1992. .
 Stachiw, Anthony L. and Andrew Tattersall. CF-104 Starfighter (Aircraft in Canadian Service). St. Catharine's, Ontario: Vanwell Publishing Limited, 2007. .
 Thompson, J. Steve with Peter C. Smith. Air Combat Manoeuvres: The Technique and History of Air Fighting for Flight Simulation. Hersham, Surrey, UK: Ian Allan Publishing, 2008. .
 Thompson, Warren. "Starfighter in Vietnam". International Air Power Review. Volume 12, Spring 2004. Norwalk, Connecticut, USA: AirTime Publishing. 2004. .
 Toliver, Raymond F. and Trevor J. Constable. Holt Hartmann vom Himmel! (in German) Stuttgart, Germany: Motorbuch Verlag, 1985. 
 Upton, Jim. Warbird Tech – Lockheed F-104 Starfighter. North Branch, Minnesota: Specialty Press, 2003. .
 USAF Class A mishap rates through the end of 2007. Kirtland AFB, NM: USAF Safety and Inspection Center, 2007.
 van der Zeeuw, Ton. "Lockheed F-104G Starfighter." Vliegend in Nederland 2 (in Dutch). Eindhoven, Netherlands: Flash Aviation, 1987. .
 Weal, John. "Jagdeschwader 'Richthofen': Phoenix Twice Risen". Wings of Fame, Volume 1, 1995, pp. 142–165. London: Aerospace Publishing. .

External links

 Lockheed XF-104 to F-104A – National Museum of the USAF
 F-104B and D – National Museum of the USAF
 F-104C – National Museum of the USAF
 F-104G – National Museum of the USAF

Lockheed F-104
Variants